Jan Apeldoorn (27 January 1765, Amersfoort – 10 February 1838, Amersfoort) was a Dutch landscape painter, watercolorist, draftsman, art teacher, and miniaturist painter.

Apeldoorn was a pupil of Jordan Hoorn in Amersfoort. He painted only few pictures in oil. He lived in Utrecht for fifty years (from 1788 to 1838), but died in his native town in 1838.

References
Jan Apeldoorn at the RKD
Attribution:
 

1765 births
1838 deaths
19th-century Dutch painters
Dutch male painters
People from Amersfoort
Artists from Utrecht
19th-century Dutch male artists